Joseph Cumpson Scott (9 January 1930 – 30 January 2018) was an English former professional footballer who played as an inside forward in the Football League for Luton Town, Middlesbrough, Hartlepools United and York City, in non-League football for Spennymoor United and Ashington, and was on the books of Newcastle United without making a league appearance.

References

1930 births
2018 deaths
People from Fatfield
Footballers from Tyne and Wear
Footballers from County Durham
English footballers
Association football forwards
Newcastle United F.C. players
Spennymoor United F.C. players
Luton Town F.C. players
Middlesbrough F.C. players
Hartlepool United F.C. players
York City F.C. players
Ashington A.F.C. players
English Football League players